Luis Rodolfo Enríquez Martínez (born 23 June 1970) is a Mexican politician affiliated with the National Action Party. As of 2014 he served as Deputy of the LX Legislature of the Mexican Congress representing Baja California.

References

1970 births
Living people
People from Tijuana
National Action Party (Mexico) politicians
Politicians from Baja California
21st-century Mexican politicians
Deputies of the LX Legislature of Mexico
Members of the Chamber of Deputies (Mexico) for Baja California